Taft is an unincorporated community in Butler County, in the U.S. state of Missouri.

History
A post office called Taft was established in 1904, and remained in operation until 1927. The community was named after William Howard Taft.

References

Unincorporated communities in Butler County, Missouri
Unincorporated communities in Missouri